The following highways are numbered 246:

Canada
 Nova Scotia Route 246
 Prince Edward Island Route 246

Costa Rica
 National Route 246

Japan
 Japan National Route 246

United States
 Arkansas Highway 246
 California State Route 246
 Georgia State Route 246
 Indiana State Road 246
 K-246 (Kansas highway)
  Kentucky Route 246
 Maryland Route 246
 Minnesota State Highway 246
 Missouri Route 246
 Montana Secondary Highway 246
 New Mexico State Road 246
 New York State Route 246
 Ohio State Route 246
 Pennsylvania Route 246
 Rhode Island Route 246
 South Carolina Highway 246
 Tennessee State Route 246
 Texas State Highway 246 (former)
 Texas State Highway Spur 246
 Farm to Market Road 246 (Texas)
 Utah State Route 246 (former)
 Virginia State Route 246